Eugen Hamm (3 April 1869 – 6 May 1944) was a German cinematographer.

Selected filmography
 Blonde Poison (1919)
 Diamonds (1920)
 The Black Count (1920)
 The Skull of Pharaoh's Daughter (1920)
 The Love Corridor (1921)
 The Woman in the Trunk (1921)
 The Adventuress of Monte Carlo (1921)
 The Riddle of the Sphinx (1921)
 Fratricide (1922)
 Esterella (1923)
 The Beautiful Girl (1923)
 Christopher Columbus (1923)
 Za La Mort (1924)
 Mountain of Destiny (1924)
 Girls, Beware! (1928)

Bibliography
 Jung, Uli & Schatzberg, Walter. Beyond Caligari: The Films of Robert Wiene. Berghahn Books, 1999.

External links

1869 births
1944 deaths
German cinematographers
People from Kehl
Film people from Baden-Württemberg